Dan Clement Fike, Jr. (born June 16, 1961) is an American former college and professional football player who was an offensive lineman in the National Football League (NFL) for eleven seasons during the 1980s and 1990s.  He played college football for the University of Florida, and thereafter, he played professionally for the New York Jets, the Cleveland Browns and the Pittsburgh Steelers of the NFL.

Early life 

Fike was born in Mobile, Alabama.  He played youth football at the Myrtle Grove association. He attended Pine Forest High School in Pensacola, Florida, and played high school football for the Pine Forest Eagles.

College career 

Fike accepted an athletic scholarship to attend the University of Florida in Gainesville, Florida, where he played for coach Charley Pell's Florida Gators football from 1979 to 1982.  While he was an undergraduate, he was a member of Pi Kappa Phi Fraternity (Alpha Epsilon Chapter).  As a freshman, he lived through the worst season in the history of the Florida football program in 1979, when the Gators posted an 0–10–1 record.  The following season, Fike was part of one of the biggest one-year turn-arounds in Division I football history, when the 1980 Gators finished 8–4 after defeating the Maryland Terrapins in the Tangerine Bowl.  He was a second-team All-Southeastern Conference (SEC) selection following his senior season in 1982.

Professional career 
After graduating from Florida, Fike was selected in the 1983 USFL Territorial Draft by the Tampa Bay Bandits. The New York Jets selected Fike in the tenth round (274th pick overall) of the 1983 NFL Draft,.  After being cut from the NFL's New York Jets, he signed with the Tampa Bay Bandits on November 13, 1984 and played two seasons as their left tackle starting all 36 regular season games and two playoff from 1984 to 1985.  When the USFL ceased operations, Fike signed with the NFL Cleveland Browns.  His coach while with the Bandits was Steve Spurrier.

He signed with the Cleveland Browns in 1985, and earned a position as a regular starter, playing at different times at offensive guard and offensive tackle, from 1985 to 1992.  Fike arrived in Cleveland at an opportune time when the team was experiencing a competitive revival, and was a starter for five consecutive Browns playoff teams (1985–1989), including appearances in the three AFC Championship Games (1987, 1988, 1990).

Fike played his final NFL season for the Pittsburgh Steelers in 1993, seeing only limited action in three games.  In his nine-season professional football career, he appeared in 141 games and started 138 of them.

See also 

 Florida Gators football, 1980–89
 List of Florida Gators in the NFL Draft
 List of New York Jets players
 List of Pi Kappa Phi alumni
 List of Pittsburgh Steelers players
 List of University of Florida alumni

References

Bibliography 

 Carlson, Norm, University of Florida Football Vault: The History of the Florida Gators, Whitman Publishing, LLC, Atlanta, Georgia (2007).  .
 Golenbock, Peter, Go Gators!  An Oral History of Florida's Pursuit of Gridiron Glory, Legends Publishing, LLC, St. Petersburg, Florida (2002).  .
 Hairston, Jack, Tales from the Gator Swamp: A Collection of the Greatest Gator Stories Ever Told, Sports Publishing, LLC, Champaign, Illinois (2002).  .
 McCarthy, Kevin M.,  Fightin' Gators: A History of University of Florida Football, Arcadia Publishing, Mount Pleasant, South Carolina (2000).  .
 Nash, Noel, ed., The Gainesville Sun Presents The Greatest Moments in Florida Gators Football, Sports Publishing, Inc., Champaign, Illinois (1998).  .

1961 births
Living people
American football offensive guards
American football offensive tackles
Cleveland Browns players
Florida Gators football players
New York Jets players
Pittsburgh Steelers players
Players of American football from Alabama
Players of American football from Pensacola, Florida
Sportspeople from Mobile, Alabama